The 5th Biathlon European Championships were held in Minsk, Belarus, from January 28 to February 1, 1998.

16 competitions were held: sprint, pursuit, individual and relays both for U26 and juniors.

Results

U26

Men's

Women's

Junior

Men's

Women's

Medal table

References

External links 
 IBU full results

Biathlon European Championships
International sports competitions hosted by Belarus
1998 in biathlon
1998 in Belarusian sport
Biathlon competitions in Belarus